Valdres videregåande skule is a high school located in the Valdres area of eastern Norway.  The school is the primary high school for the vast majority of students in the greater Valdres area, and offers a relatively broad range of subjects.

Since distances in the area are quite big, many students live in small apartments closer to the school (e.g. students from the areas farthest away may take up to an hour of travel every day by bus just to get to school).

The school was until 2001 split in two sections, one in Leira and another at Fagernes, but a new building and heavy investment from the municipal extended the Leira section to cover all the students.

At the time of writing, the principal is Kari Elisabeth Rustad, and the student count is generally around 500.

External links 
Official website

Valdres